The 7th Michigan Cavalry Regiment was a cavalry regiment that served in the Union Army during the American Civil War. It was a part of the famed Michigan Brigade, commanded for a time by Brigadier General George Armstrong Custer.

Service
The 7th Michigan Cavalry was organized at Grand Rapids, Michigan, in October 1862 by William d'Alton Mann, a future prominent Michigan newspaper and magazine publisher. He was later named as the regiment's colonel.

The regiment was mustered out of service on December 15, 1865.

Total strength and casualties
The regiment suffered 4 officers and 81 enlisted men killed in action or mortally wounded and 2 officers and 256 enlisted men who died of disease, for a total of 343 fatalities.

Commanders
 Colonel William d'Alton Mann
 Colonel Allyne C. Litchfield

Notable members
Private Abram Halstead Ellis, Company C – justice of the Kansas Supreme Court, (1901–1902)
First Sergeant Charles M. Holton, Company – Medal of Honor recipient

See also
List of Michigan Civil War Units
Michigan in the American Civil War
Mary Burns (US Civil War soldier)

Notes

References
The Civil War Archive

Cavalry
1865 disestablishments in Michigan
Michigan Brigade
1862 establishments in Michigan
Military units and formations established in 1862
Military units and formations disestablished in 1865